A constitutional referendum was held in Ethiopia on 1 February 1987. The new constitution would make the country a one-party socialist state with the Communist Workers' Party of Ethiopia as the sole legal party. It was approved by 81% of voters, with a 96.3% turnout. It was promulgated on 22 February, inaugurating the People's Democratic Republic of Ethiopia.

Background
The ruling Workers' Party of Ethiopia established a Constitutional Commission in February 1986. In August it presented a draft constitution with 119 articles. The document, modelled on the constitution of the Soviet Union, created a one-party state under the leadership of the WPE.

Results

Aftermath
The results were published on 21 February and the constitution came into force on 22 February. General elections were held on 14 June, and the country was officially renamed the People's Democratic Republic of Ethiopia on 12 September.

References

Ethiopian Civil War
1987 referendums
1987 in Ethiopia
Communism in Ethiopia
Referendums in Ethiopia
Constitutional referendums
February 1987 events in Africa

fr:Élections en Éthiopie#1987